Savery is a surname. Notable people with the surname include:

 Constance Savery (1897-1999), English author
 Gil Savery (1917-2018), American journalist
 Henry Savery (1791–1842), Australian novelist
 Jan Savery (1589–1654), Flemish painter
 Joe Savery (born 1985), baseball pitcher
 Nigel Savery (21st century), geneticist
 Roelant Savery (1576–1639), Flanders-born Dutch baroque painter
 Thomas Savery (circa 1650–1715), English inventor
 Uffe Savery (born 1966), Danish percussionist

See also
 Savery Hotel, listed on the National Register of Historic Places in Des Moines, Iowa, United States
 Savery Pond (Plymouth, Massachusetts), United States
 Savory (disambiguation)
 Savery, Wyoming, United States